Horgen District is a district of Canton of Zürich in Switzerland. The district is located in the Zimmerberg and Sihl Valley region on the left shore of Lake Zürich; its district capital is Horgen. In the northern part of the district, the municipalities have grown together with the city of Zürich, while in the south-western part, the Sihlwald is the largest contiguous natural mixed deciduous forest on the Swiss Plateau.

Municipalities
  Sihlbrugg Dorf and Samstagern are both significant villages that are not independent municipalities.

Mergers
 On 1 January 2018 the former municipality of Hirzel merged into the municipality of Horgen.
 On 1 January 2019 the former municipalities of Hütten and Schönenberg merged into the municipality of Wädenswil.

See also 
Municipalities of the canton of Zürich

References

Districts of the canton of Zürich